Sports Backers Stadium is a 3,250-seat stadium in Richmond, Virginia. The facility was opened in 1999.

Sports Backers Stadium is used throughout the year by various parties including the soccer and college athletics teams from Virginia Commonwealth University, and Virginia Union University.  The Sports Backers Marathon Training Team meets at the stadium every Saturday and Sunday for 23 weeks to prepare runners for the Anthem Richmond Marathon

Sports Backers Stadium is home to the Sports Backers' central office.  Sports Backers' mission is to make the Richmond area the most physically active region in the country.

References 

Sports venues in Richmond, Virginia
Soccer venues in Virginia
College soccer venues in the United States
Defunct National Premier Soccer League stadiums
1999 establishments in Virginia
Sports venues completed in 1999